The Heritage Council of Victoria is a statutory authority in the Australian state of Victoria responsible for the protection and conservation of the state's history. It is responsible for maintaining the Victorian Heritage Register and administering the Victorian Heritage Database.

The council was headed by historian Stuart Macintyre from 2015 until his retirement due to ill health in 2020. The current council members are:
 Prof Philip Goad, Chair
 Prof Andrew May (historian), Deputy Chair, History Member
 Margaret Baird, Urban or Regional Planning Member
 Rueben Berg, Aboriginal person with relevant experience and knowledge of cultural heritage
 Megan Goulding, Archaeology Member
 Louise Honman, Architectural conservation/Architectural history Member
 Justin Naylor, Financial Management Member
 Jeffrey Robinson, Engineering/Building Construction Member
 Natica Schmeder, National Trust Member
 Simon Molesworth AO, QC, Legal member
 Dr Mark Burgess, Alternate Financial Management Member
 Adrian Finanzio SC, GAICD, Alternate Heritage Law Member
 Anna Foley, Alternate National Trust Member 
 Jo Guard, Alternate Urban or Regional Planning Member 
 David Hogg, Alternate Engineering/Building Construction Member
 Jamie Lowe, Alternate member, Aboriginal person with relevant experience and knowledge of cultural heritage
 Dr Karen Murphy, Alternate Archaeology Member
 Dr Christine Phillips, Alternate Architectural conservation/Architectural history Member
 Maggi Solly, Alternate General Member 
 Dr Helen Doyle, Alternate History Member

References

History of Victoria (Australia)
Government agencies of Victoria (Australia)
Culture in Victoria (Australia)